Spirne is a rural settlement in Bakhmut Raion, Donetsk Oblast, Ukraine. It belongs to the Soledar urban hromada, one of the hromadas of Ukraine. According to the 2001 Census, the village has a population of 80. A gas compression station and farm are located in the village, and the Mount Vesuvius Nature Reserve is located nearby.

History 
In July 2022, during and after the Battle of Siversk, the village was a site of heavy fighting.

Demographics 
According to the 2001 Census, the village has a population of 80. 70% of residents were native Ukrainian speakers, while the remaining 30% were native Russian speakers.

References 

Villages in Bakhmut Raion
Rural settlements in Donetsk Oblast